Quirpa de tres mujeres (Quirpa of three women) is a Venezuelan telenovela produced by Venevisión in 1996, based on the series Las Amazonas written by César Miguel Rondón in 1985.

Fedra López and Danilo Santos starred as the main protagonists accompanied by Gabriela Spanic, Mónica Rubio, Juan Carlos Vivas as co-protagonists, while Julio Alcázar and Milena Santander starred as antagonists.

Plot
Gonzalo Landeata was a rich landowner who suffered a terrible betrayal from Vicente Echeverría who stole his land and his wife thereby making him die in sorrow. His three beautiful daughters Manuela, Emiliana and Camila, are filled with a strong passion that Vicente, who has raised them with a firm hand, will ensure that it ends.

Manuela is to be married to Ezequiel, but she begins to have a change of heart when she meets Rodrigo, a man whose tenderness and passion causes her deep confusion. Emiliana is torn between the love of a man and respect for her father when she falls in love with Juan Cristobal Landeata, an older man who is her father's worst enemy. Camila goes to defy her father by falling in love with Dario, her childhood playmate whom Vicente views as a simple peasant unworthy of his daughter's affections

Cast
 Fedra López as Manuela Echeverría Castañón
 Danilo Santos as Rodrigo Uzcátegui Calderón
 Julio Alcázar as Don Vicente Echeverría Olmos   
 Daniel Lugo as Juan Cristóbal Landaeta
 Gabriela Spanic as Emiliana Echeverría Castañón 
 Mónica Rubio as Camila Echeverría Castañón
 Juan Carlos Vivas as Darío Guanipa
 Cristina Reyes as Betania Rangel
 Henry Galué as Ezequiel Erellano
 Milena Santander as Eva (Evangelina) Azcárraga de Echeverría
 Carlos Antonio León as Manny
 Ivette Domínguez as Tibisay
 Sofía Díaz as Daniela Uzcátegui
 Duly Garaterol as Isabela Uzcátegui
 José Rafael Giménez as Gabriel Erellano 
 Ramón Hinojosa as Santos Ortiz 
 Eva Moreno as Mercedes Landaeta
 Yolanda Muñoz as Plácida Guanipa
 Javier Paredes as José María Carasquel 
 Elluz Peraza as Consuelo 
 José Luis Zuleta as Lorenzo Real

References

External links
 

1996 telenovelas
Venevisión telenovelas
Venezuelan telenovelas
1996 Venezuelan television series debuts
1996 Venezuelan television series endings
Spanish-language telenovelas
Television shows set in Venezuela